Louis Rubenstein (September 23, 1861, in Montreal – January 3, 1931) was a Canadian figure skater, sportsman and politician. Rubenstein is considered the "Father of Canadian Figure Skating." After retirement from skating in 1892, Rubenstein became involved in the sports of bowling, curling, and cycling. He was elected president of the Canadian Bowling Association in 1895, president of the International Skating Union of America in 1909. He was alderman in St. Louis ward in Montreal from 1916 until 1931.

Biography
Rubenstein was born and raised in Montreal, Quebec. His parents were Polish Jews who had fled Russian rule.
He was coached by Jackson Haines.

Rubenstein was chosen to represent Canada in an unofficial international championships that were one of the precursors of the World Figure Skating Championships, in St. Petersburg, Russia. Although being subject of a great deal of antisemitism there, he won the gold medal.

Rubenstein helped organize the Amateur Skating Association of Canada, now known as Skate Canada. He served as the organization's president from its foundation until 1930.

He was President of the International Skating Union of America 1907–09, President of the Canadian Wheelmen's Association for 18 years, and President of the Montréal Amateur Athletic Association 1913–15.

Rubenstein was inducted into the International Jewish Sports Hall of Fame in 1981 and  the World Figure Skating Hall of Fame in 1984.

There is a memorial water fountain dedicated to Rubenstein in Montreal at Parc Jeanne-Mance at the corner of Park Avenue and Mount Royal Avenues.

Rubenstein served as a Montreal alderman for 17 years. In 2016, he was named a National Historic Person.

See also
 List of select Jewish figure skaters
 Victoria Skating Rink

Notes

References

External links
Jewish Sports bio
Canadian Encyclopedia bio
Jews in Sports bio
"Louis Rubenstein's story recounted on film," The Canadian Jewish News, 6/3/04

1861 births
1931 deaths
Canadian male single skaters
Figure skaters from Montreal
Jewish Canadian politicians
Montreal city councillors
Jewish Canadian sportspeople
Canadian people of Polish-Jewish descent
Persons of National Historic Significance (Canada)